Texas Dynamo is a 1950 American Western film directed by Ray Nazarro and written by Barry Shipman. The film stars Charles Starrett, Smiley Burnette, Lois Hall, Jock Mahoney, Slim Duncan and John Dehner. The film was released on June 1, 1950, by Columbia Pictures.

Plot

Cast          
Charles Starrett as Steve Drake / The Durango Kid
Smiley Burnette as Smiley Burnette
Lois Hall as Julia Beck
Jock Mahoney as Bill Beck 
Slim Duncan as Slim Duncan
John Dehner as Stanton
George Chesebro as Kroger
Gregg Barton as Luke
Marshall Bradford as Walt Beck
Fred F. Sears as Hawkins 
Emil Sitka as Turkey

References

External links
 

1950 films
1950s English-language films
American Western (genre) films
1950 Western (genre) films
Columbia Pictures films
Films directed by Ray Nazarro
American black-and-white films
1950s American films